Charles Ernest Green (26 August 1846 – 4 December 1916) was an English cricketer active from 1865 to 1881 who played for Middlesex and Sussex. He was born in Walthamstow and died in Epping. He appeared in 94 first-class matches as a righthanded batsman who bowled right arm fast with a roundarm action. He scored 2,488 runs with a highest score of 72 and took 66 wickets with a best performance of eight for 66.

Green was educated at Uppingham School and Trinity College, Cambridge. He played cricket for Cambridge 1865–68, and was captain in 1868. He also earned a blue for athletics (high jump). He was president of Marylebone Cricket Club in 1905.

Notes

1846 births
1916 deaths
English cricketers
Sussex cricketers
Middlesex cricketers
Marylebone Cricket Club cricketers
Gentlemen of the South cricketers
Gentlemen cricketers
North v South cricketers
Over 30s v Under 30s cricketers
Cambridge University cricketers
Gentlemen of England cricketers
People educated at Uppingham School
Alumni of Trinity College, Cambridge
Presidents of the Marylebone Cricket Club